The 1947–48 Providence Steamrollers season was the second season of the Providence Steamrollers.

Draft picks

Roster

Regular season

Season standings

Record vs. opponents

Game log

Player statistics

Transactions

Trades

Purchases

Sales

Free agency

Subtractions

References 

Providence
Providence Steamrollers seasons